The Painter is the eighth studio album by the funk and disco group KC and the Sunshine Band. Produced by Harry Wayne Casey and Richard Finch, it was released in September 1981 on the Epic label.

History
The Painter, like its predecessor, was not successful, as the band turned to a more pop-focused music.

A notable track on this album is the ballad "All Through the Night". The song was co-written by Bruce Roberts and Donna Summer, and was first recorded by Summer for her 1979 album Bad Girls.

Track listing

Personnel
Harry Wayne Casey – keyboards, vocal
Anthony Battaglia – keyboards, guitar, background vocals
Victor Paliuca – keyboards
Ernest Stewart – keyboards
Blue Weaver – keyboards
Paul Nolan  -  guitar
Tommy Johnson – guitar
Richard Finch – bass guitar, percussion
Emmanuel Taylor – bass
Harold Seay – drum
Fermin Goytisolo – percussion
Jimmy "Bo" Horne – percussion
Stewart Brenner – trumpet
Ken Faulk – trumpet
Brett Murphey – trumpet
Fredric Hughes Jr. – horn
Michael Katz – trombone
Dan Bonsanti – saxophone
Neil Bonsanti – saxophone
Charlie Chalmers – saxophone, background vocals
Mike Lewis – saxophone
Whit Sidener – saxophone
Eugene Timmons – saxophone
Robert Basso – strings
David Chappell – strings
Bogdan Chruszcz – strings
David Everhart – strings
Marjorie Lash – strings
Jose Montoto – strings
Ignus Naruns – strings
Alfredo Oliva – strings
Jorge Orbon – strings
Alexander Prilutchi – strings
Debra Spring – strings
Guy Weddle – strings
Deborah Carter – background vocals
Sandra Chalmers – background vocals
Beverly Champion – background vocals
Denise King – background vocals
Sandra Rhodes – background vocals
Sarah Naylor - background vocals

References

External links
 The Painter at Discogs

KC and the Sunshine Band albums
1981 albums
Epic Records albums